The  was a Japanese two-seat STOL experimental reconnaissance aircraft developed by Kobe Steel in 1942 for service in World War II. In accordance with the Army's request, Professor T. Miki, Osaka Imperial University designed and Kobe Seikojo built the Te-Gō. No "Ki" code number was assigned there to since the project was outside the jurisdiction of the Army Aviation Headquarters.

This aircraft was one of two competitors for an Imperial Japanese Army STOL  liaison and observation aircraft. Inspired by the Fieseler Storch, Prof. Tetsuo Miki of Osaka University designed this aircraft.  Although the aircraft was similar to the Storch, it was not by any means a copy.

Using construction methods common at that time, the wing were made of a wood spar and ribs, covered with fabric/plywood. Automatic slots along the length of the leading edges, large Fowler-type flaps were installed along the trailing edges, and the ailerons were also used as flaps for very short take off. The fuselage had a steel tube frame that was fabric-covered from the cockpit back and the nose was covered with sheet metal. The tail components had the same structure as the wings. A 7.7 mm flexible machine gun was planned for installation at the rear seat to obtain a clear upper rear field of fire.

The aircraft crashed, with extensive damage to the wing and landing gear. Because of this accident, the second submission, the Kayaba Ka-go autogyro, was selected  and entered service as the Kayaba Ka-1.

Specifications (Te-Gō)

See also

References

1940s Japanese military reconnaissance aircraft
Single-engined tractor aircraft
STOL aircraft
Aircraft first flown in 1942